Allegiance is the debut studio album by American deathcore band As Blood Runs Black. This is the band's only release with vocalist Chris Blair and guitarist Ernie Flores.

Background
As Blood Runs Black was formed in 2003 in Los Angeles by vocalists Louie Ruvalcaba and Enrique "Ricky" Martin, guitarists Bijon Roybal and Kyle Hasenstab, bassist Richard Reyes, and drummer Brian "Animal" Matute. Matute would depart the band shortly after its formation and was replaced by Hector "Lech" De Santiago. The band recorded a demo in 2004 and another one in 2005; both demos featured the songs "Hester Prynne" and "In Dying Days", both of which would be re-recorded for Allegiance.

After the 2005 demo, the band was preparing to enter the studio to record its debut album, but every member except De Santiago left the band. De Santiago recruited vocalist Chris Blair, guitarist Ernie Flores, and bassist Nick Stewart to resume work on the band's debut. This lineup would record the Halloween of Massacre demo, which featured the songs "In Dying Days", "My Fears..." (later re-titled "My Fears Have Become Phobias"), "Hester Prynne", and "Chug Chug" (later re-titled "Strife (Chug Chug)"); all four songs would be re-recorded for Allegiance.

Allegiance was recorded in early 2006 and was self-produced by the band, with Baron Bodnar serving as executive producer.

Track listing

Credits
As Blood Runs Black
Chris Blair – vocals
Ernie Flores – guitar
Nick Stewart – bass
Hector "Lech" De Santiago – drums
Production
Produced by As Blood Runs Black
Recorded by Zack Ohren @ Castle Ultimate Studios
Executive Producer & Management – Baron Bodnar
Artwork
Layout by Calvin Exline

References

2006 debut albums
As Blood Runs Black albums
Mediaskare Records albums